The Take My Hand World Tour (previously known as the No Shame Tour) was the fourth headlining concert tour by Australian pop rock band 5 Seconds of Summer in support of their fourth and fifth studio albums Calm (2020) and 5SOS5 (2022). The tour began on 3 April 2022 in Dublin at the 3Arena and concluded on 10 December 2022 in Sydney at the Sydney Opera House Forecourt, consisting of 68 dates in total.

Originally scheduled to begin on 11 May 2020 in Belfast, Northern Ireland, the tour was rescheduled to 2022 due to the ongoing COVID-19 pandemic.

Background
Following their tour with the Chainsmokers, the band announced on 28 November 2019 that they would be touring both the United Kingdom and Europe in 2020. The North American tour dates were later announced on 31 January 2020 with The Band Camino set to be the opening act for all shows in the US, Mexico and Canada. On 5 February 2020, the band announced the release of their fourth studio album, Calm, which was released on 27 March 2020. Following the album release statement, the Australian tour dates, taking place between 27 November 2020 and 5 December 2020, were announced on 17 February 2020. The first added Sydney show sold out within hours. Due to overwhelming demand, a second Sydney show, at the Sydney Opera House Forecourt, was added to take place on 6 December 2020. On 24 February 2020, Coin was announced as the opening act for the UK dates, All Time Low for the European dates and lovelytheband for the Latin America dates. Tickets for the North American and Australian dates were released via LiveNation, on 7 February 2020 and 21 February 2020, respectively.

On 27 March 2020, the band released their fourth studio album Calm. The album was a commercial success and received generally positive reviews from critics who praised the band's artistic growth and maturity. The album charted in more than 25 countries on several charts and debuted atop the charts at number one in Australia, the UK and Scotland. The album peaked in the top ten on seventeen charts, including number two in Mexico and number four in Austria, Estonia, Ireland, New Zealand and Portugal.

Prior to the official tour announcement, in June 2019 it was revealed that, as part of the tour, the band would perform as headliners for the 2020 annual Orange Warsaw Festival in Poland, originally scheduled to take place on 5 June 2020. In March 2020, it was announced that the 2020 Orange Warsaw Festival had been cancelled, due to the ongoing COVID-19 pandemic. It was subsequently announced that the European and UK leg would be postponed to 2021.

On 26 June 2020, the band announced that the North America and Australian tour dates would be rescheduled to 2021 due to the COVID-19 pandemic. The band also announced additional shows in the United States, United Kingdom and Europe. On 16 February 2021, the band stated that the Australian dates, originally rescheduled for March 2021, would once again be postponed. However, they confirmed that they do have new rescheduled dates in negotiations that coincide with the band's tenth anniversary.

On 7 October 2021, the four members announced that the Oceania's dates would be postponed again due the COVID-19 pandemic. The band later announced an exclusive performance on 22 September 2022 at the Royal Albert Hall in London, England, in which they will perform with a live orchestra.

Set list 

The following set list is representative of the first show of the tour in Dublin, Ireland, and does not represent the majority of the shows for the duration of the tour:

 "No Shame"
 "Easier"
 "More"
 "Want You Back"
 "Disconnected"
 "Take My Hand"
 "Red Desert"
 "Talk Fast"
 "Beside You"
 "Waste the Night"
 "Complete Mess"
 "Lover of Mine"
 "Who Do You Love"
 "Wildflower"
 "Best Years" 
 "Easy for You to Say"
 "If Walls Could Talk"
 "Old Me"
 "Amnesia"
 "2011" 
 "Castaway"
 "She Looks So Perfect"
 "Teeth"
 "Jet Black Heart"
Encore
 "Ghost of You"
 "Youngblood"

Tour dates

Cancelled shows

Personnel 
Luke Hemmings – lead vocals, rhythm guitar, piano
Michael Clifford – lead guitar, vocals, piano
Calum Hood – bass guitar, keyboard, vocals
Ashton Irwin – drums, percussion, vocals

References

Notes

Citations

2022 concert tours
5 Seconds of Summer concert tours
Concert tours postponed due to the COVID-19 pandemic